The Reckoning is a 1908 American silent short drama film directed by D. W. Griffith. It is an adaptation of Robert W. Chambers's 1905 novel.

Cast
 Harry Solter as The Husband
 Florence Lawrence as The Wife
 Mack Sennett as The Lover
 Edward Dillon		
 George Gebhardt as The Bartender
 Robert Harron as Man in Crowd
 Arthur V. Johnson as Policeman

See also
America (1924)

References

External links
 

1908 films
1908 drama films
1908 short films
Silent American drama films
American silent short films
American black-and-white films
Films based on works by Robert W. Chambers
Films directed by D. W. Griffith
1900s American films